Benjamin Sene (born 13 May 1994) is a French professional basketball player for Nanterre 92 of the LNB Pro A.

Professional career
Sene played junior basketball with SLUC Nancy. In January 2013, he fractured his thumb. On 2 March 2013 he suffered a fracture to his left radius. On 7 March he had surgery and plastering, forcing him to miss two months of competition. At the end of his junior career, he was courted by Boulogne-sur-Mer but stayed with Nancy. In March 2014, he injured his ankle in training and missed three weeks of competition. In April 2015, he extended his contract with Nancy until 2017.

Sene joined BCM Gravelines-Dunkerque in May 2017. In 2017-18 Sene averaged 10.3 points, 2.9 rebounds and 4.9 assists per game with Gravelines-Dunkerque. After the season he signed an extension to his contract until 2020. Sene left the team on 8 May, after averaging 11.3 points and 3.8 assists in 2019-2020.

Sene signed with Boulazac Basket Dordogne on 14 May 2020.

On 9 July 2021 he signed with Nanterre 92 of LNB Pro A.

References 

1994 births
Living people
BCM Gravelines players
Boulazac Basket Dordogne players
French men's basketball players
Nanterre 92 players
People from Langon, Gironde
Point guards
SLUC Nancy Basket players
Sportspeople from Gironde